Pablo Herrera Barrantes (born 14 February 1987, in Alajuela) is a Costa Rican professional footballer for Municipal Grecia.

Club career
After playing for Alajuelense, Herrera joined Norwegian club Aalesund in August 2009. After the 2011-season, Aalesund and Herrera decided to terminate the contract, as Herrera never managed to recover from an injury. In September 2012, he was snapped up by Uruguay de Coronado and in summer 2013 he joined Cartaginés.

In December 2014, Cartaginés declared they could lose the player over a legal battle with former club Alajuelense.

International career
Herrera played at the 2007 FIFA U-20 World Cup in Canada.

He made his senior debut for Costa Rica in a friendly against Peru on 22 August 2007. He scored his first goal in a 2010 FIFA World Cup qualifying match against the United States on 3 June 2009.

Career statistics

References

External links
 Profile at Nacion 
 

1987 births
Living people
People from Alajuela
Association football defenders
Costa Rican footballers
Costa Rica international footballers
2009 UNCAF Nations Cup players
2009 CONCACAF Gold Cup players
L.D. Alajuelense footballers
Aalesunds FK players
C.S. Cartaginés players
Costa Rican expatriate footballers
Costa Rican expatriate sportspeople in Norway
Expatriate footballers in Norway
Liga FPD players
Eliteserien players